Simplicity is the seventh studio album by American hard rock band Tesla. It was released on June 10, 2014 in the US and four days earlier in Europe, "Simplicity", sold around 14,000 copies in the United States in its first week of release to land at position No. 24 on The Billboard 200 chart. The record arrived in stores on June 10 via Tesla Electric Company Recording's arrangement with Entertainment One Music and distribution.

Track listing

North American / European / Japanese versions

Personnel
Band
 Jeff Keith - lead vocals
 Frank Hannon - guitars, vocals, piano, bass
 Brian Wheat - bass, vocals, piano
 Troy Luccketta - drums, percussion
 Dave Rude - guitars, vocals, bass

Production
 Michael Wagener - mixing & Mastering
 Tom Zutaut (Rock Radio Hall of Fame 2014 inductee) & TESLA - Producers

Charts

References

Tesla (band) albums
2014 albums